In the United States, each state maintains its own system of state highways. This is a list of the longest state highways in each state.

List of highways

Notes

See also

References

External links
 

State highways in the United States
State highways